Paul Jeffery Hall (born July 30, 1976) is a former American football placekicker in the National Football League for the St. Louis Rams.  He played college football at the University of Tennessee, and was drafted in the sixth round of the 1999 NFL Draft with the 181st overall pick by the Washington Redskins.  After leaving the NFL, he became a NFLPA-registered financial advisor for Rather & Kittrell Capital Management in Knoxville, Tennessee.

Hall still holds the Tennessee high school record for the longest field goal at 62 yards, which he kicked for Franklin County High School on November 19, 1991 in a playoff game against Oak Ridge High School. Hall tied his own record with a 62-yard field goal against Brentwood Academy on October 16, 1992.

Hall was the starting placekicker for the Tennessee Volunteer football team that won the National Championship in the 1998 season.

Hall married Stacey Sherwood on April 10, 2010.

References

1976 births
Living people
American football placekickers
St. Louis Rams players
Tennessee Volunteers football players
People from Winchester, Tennessee
Players of American football from Tennessee
Memphis Maniax players